Mongondow may be,

Mongondow people
Mongondow language

See also
Kingdom of Bolaang Mongondow
Bolaang Mongondow Regency